This article contains an overview of the year 1987 in athletics.

International Events
 All-Africa Games
 Asian Championships
 Central American and Caribbean Championships
 European Indoor Championships
 Mediterranean Games
 Pan American Games
 World Championships
 World Indoor Championships
 World Cross Country Championships
 World Student Games

World records

Men

Carl Lewis (USA) equalled the world record in the men's 100 metres held by countryman Calvin Smith since 1983-07-03, clocking 9.93 seconds on 1987-08-30 at the World Championships in Rome, Italy.

Women

Jackie Joyner-Kersee (USA) equalled the world record in the women's long jump held by East Germany's Heike Drechsler since 1986-06-21, jumping 7.45 metres on 1987-08-13 at a meet in Indianapolis.

Men's Best Year Performers

100 metres
Main race this year: World Championships 100 metres

200 metres
Main race this year: World Championships 200 metres

400 metres
Main race this year: World Championships 400 metres

800 metres
Main race this year: World Championships 800 metres

1,500 metres
Main race this year: World Championships 1.500 metres

Mile

3,000 metres

5,000 metres
Main race this year: World Championships 5.000 metres

10,000 metres
Main race this year: World Championships 10.000 metres

Half Marathon

Marathon
Main race this year: World Championships Marathon

110m Hurdles
Main race this year: World Championships 110m Hurdles

400m Hurdles
Main race this year: World Championships 400m Hurdles

3,000m Steeplechase
Main race this year: World Championships 3.000m Steeplechase

High Jump
Main competition this year: World Championships High Jump

Long Jump
Main competition this year: World Championships Long Jump

Triple Jump
Main competition this year: World Championships Triple Jump

Discus
Main competition this year: World Championships Discus Throw

Shot Put
Main competition this year: World Championships Shot Put

Hammer

Javelin (new design)
Main competition this year: World Championships Javelin Throw

Pole Vault
Main competition this year: World Championships Pole Vault

Decathlon
Main competition this year: World Championships Decathlon

Women's Best Year Performers

100 metres

200 metres

400 metres

800 metres

1,500 metres

Mile

3,000 metres

5,000 metres

10,000 metres

Half Marathon

Marathon

100m Hurdles

400m Hurdles

High Jump

Long Jump

Shot Put

Javelin (old design)

Heptathlon

Births
January 1 — Rytis Sakalauskas, Lithuanian sprinter
January 17 — Svetlana Radzivil, Uzbekistani high jumper
January 27 — Liliya Kulyk, Ukrainian triple jumper
March 5 — Vitalij Kozlov, Lithuanian middle distance runner
April 17 — Atsede Baysa, Ethiopian long-distance runner
April 24 — Franklin Nazareno, Ecuadorian  sprinter
July 14 — Margus Hunt, Estonian discus thrower
July 22 — Hugo Chila, Ecuadorian long jumper and triple jumper
August 9 — Marek Niit, Estonian sprinter
September 1 — Leonel Suárez, Cuban decathlete
September 13 — Vincent Kipruto, Kenyan long-distance runner
October 3 — Ancuţa Bobocel, Romanian long-distance runner
November 1 — Jimmy Adar, Ugandan middle distance runner
November 17 — Nadiya Dusanova, Uzbekistani high jumper
December 1 — Tabarie Henry, United States Virgin Islands sprinter
December 21 — Denis Alekseyev, Russian sprinter

Deaths
March 17 — Georg Lammers (81), German athlete (b. 1905)
October 20 — Jerzy Chromik (56), Polish long-distance runner (b. 1931)

References
 Year Lists
 1987 Year Rankings
 Association of Road Racing Statisticians

 
Athletics (track and field) by year